Brett Howden (born March 29, 1998) is a Canadian ice hockey centre for the Vegas Golden Knights of the National Hockey League (NHL). Howden was drafted 27th overall in the 2016 NHL Entry Draft by the Tampa Bay Lightning.

Playing career

Junior
On June 25, 2016, the Tampa Bay Lightning selected Howden in the first round of the 2016 NHL Entry draft with the 27th overall pick. In the season leading up to the NHL draft, Howden recorded 24 goals and 40 assists over 68 games with the Moose Jaw Warriors. Howden finished fourth on the team in goals and points. Howden also added four goals and eleven assists in fifteen postseason games, which included four-straight multi-point games in the first round against the Prince Albert Raiders. In addition, Howden was named the Warriors' Rookie of the Year and Most Sportsmanlike Player during his rookie year in the Western Hockey League (WHL) in 2014–15. Howden has played two seasons with Lightning forward Brayden Point. Howden said that the team's familiarity with Point and their scouting of Moose Jaw played a role in their decision to select him. The team had spoken some to Point about Howden leading up to the 2016 Draft.

On September 30, 2016, the Warriors named Howden the 31st captain in team history. Howden had previously served as an assistant captain the previous season as a 17-year-old, and had also served as captain of Team Canada, leading the team to a gold medal during the 2015 Ivan Hlinka Memorial Cup. Howden credited former Warriors captain, Brayden Point, with his growth as a leader on the team.

On December 28, 2016, Howden signed a three-year entry-level contract with the Tampa Bay Lightning.

Professional

After the Moose Jaw Warriors were eliminated from the 2017 WHL playoffs, Howden joined the Syracuse Crunch on an amateur try out agreement. On April 7, 2017, the Crunch's head coach, Benoit Groulx, announced that Howden will be making his professional hockey debut against the Binghamton Senators. On April 8, 2017, Howden scored his first career professional goal against the Albany Devils. The goal came in a 3–2 Crunch win at the Oncenter War Memorial Arena. On April 12, 2017, Howden recorded his first career professional assist against the Utica Comets. The assist came in a 7–2 Crunch win at the Utica Memorial Auditorium.

On February 26, 2018, Howden was traded to the New York Rangers, along with Vladislav Namestnikov, Libor Hajek, and a 2018 and 2019 draft picks, for Ryan McDonagh and J. T. Miller.

On July 17, 2021, Howden was traded to the Vegas Golden Knights in exchange for Nick DeSimone and a fourth-round pick in the 2022 NHL Entry Draft.

International play

On October 20, 2016, the Western Hockey League announced its Team WHL roster for the 2016 CIBC Canada Russia Series, which named Howden as one of its 12 forwards. Team WHL will face team Russia in game one in Prince George, British Columbia on Monday, November 7, before continuing on to Edmonton for game 2 on Tuesday, November 8. The Ontario Hockey League will compete in games 4 and 5, and Quebec Major Junior Hockey League will finish the event in games 5 and 6.

On November 29, 2016, Howden was announced as one of the Team Canada invitees for the World Junior Championships U-20 training camp. Howden was joined by five other Lightning prospects. On December 13, 2016, Howden was released from the Canadian World Junior camp as part of the initial roster cuts.

On December 6, 2017, Howden was named as a player for the Team Canada World Junior Championship selection camp roster.

Personal life
Howden's brother Quinton was selected in the first round of the 2010 draft by the Florida Panthers.

Career statistics

Regular season and playoffs

International

References

External links

1998 births
Living people
Canadian ice hockey centres
People from Oakbank, Manitoba
Ice hockey people from Manitoba
Moose Jaw Warriors players
National Hockey League first-round draft picks
New York Rangers players
Syracuse Crunch players
Tampa Bay Lightning draft picks
Vegas Golden Knights players